Hillside is a historic home located near Carlisle, Union County, South Carolina.  It was built between 1820 and 1830, and is a two-story, "L-shaped" Federal style clapboard structure.  It features a central double piazza with slender Tuscan order wooden columns.  It was enlarged about 1850. Also on the property are tall granite gate posts with folk art relief sculpture. The posts are believed to have been carved about 1861 by J. E. Sherman, a Union soldier who became ill and was left at Hillside to recuperate prior to the American Civil War. Also on the property are a hand-hewn barn, a well with modern well-house, and another small 19th century structure.

It was added to the National Register of Historic Places in 1978.

References

Houses on the National Register of Historic Places in South Carolina
Federal architecture in South Carolina
Houses completed in 1830
Houses in Union County, South Carolina
National Register of Historic Places in Union County, South Carolina
1830 establishments in South Carolina